Lithic may refer to:
Relating to stone tools
Lithic analysis, the analysis of stone tools and other chipped stone artifacts
Lithic core, the part of a stone which has had flakes removed from it
Lithic flake, the portion of a rock removed to make a tool
Lithic reduction, the process of removing flakes from a stone to make a tool
Lithic technology, the array of techniques to produce tools from stone
Lithic fragment (geology), pieces of rock, eroded to sand size, and now sand grains in a sedimentary rock
Lithic sandstone, sandstone with a significant component of (above) lithic fragments
Lithic stage, the North American prehistoric period before 10,000 years ago

See also
Stone Age
Paleolithic
Mesolithic
Neolithic
Stone carving